is a railway station on the Sekishō Line in Yūbari, Hokkaido, Japan, operated by Hokkaido Railway Company (JR Hokkaido).

Lines
Shin-Yūbari Station is served by the Sekisho Line, and is situated 43.0 km from the starting point of the line at Minami-Chitose Station. The station is numbered "K20". It was also the terminal station for Sekishō Line Yūbari Branch before the line ceased operation on 31 March 2019.

Station layout
The station has two ground-level island platforms serving four tracks. The station has an automated ticket machine and a "Midori no Madoguchi" staffed ticket office. The Kitaca farecard cannot be used at this station.

Platforms

History
It was renamed Shin-Yubari on 1 October 1981. With the privatization of Japanese National Railways (JNR) on 1 April 1987, the station came under the control of JR Hokkaido. The Yūbari Branch Line was discontinued on 31 March 2019.

Surrounding area 
Momijiyama Post office

See also
 List of railway stations in Japan

References

Railway stations in Hokkaido Prefecture
Railway stations in Japan opened in 1892